In mathematics, a recurrent point for a function f is a point that is in its own limit set by f. Any neighborhood containing the recurrent point will also contain (a countable number of) iterates of it as well.

Definition
Let  be a Hausdorff space and   a function. A point  is said to be recurrent (for ) if  , i.e. if  belongs to its -limit set. This means that for each neighborhood  of  there exists  such that  .

References

Limit sets